Paul James Chirik (born Philadelphia, Pennsylvania on June 13, 1973) is an American chemist and the Edwards S. Sanford Professor of Chemistry at Princeton University. He is the editor-in-chief of Organometallics and an expert in sustainable chemistry and catalysis with Earth-abundant transition metals.

Early life and career 
Chirik was born in Philadelphia, Pennsylvania on June 13, 1973. He graduated magna cum laude with a Bachelor's of Science in Chemistry in 1995 from Virginia Tech having conducted research with Joseph Merola. He earned his Ph.D. with John Bercaw at Caltech studying the mechanism of metallocene-catalyzed olefin polymerization and hydrometallation chemistry in which he was recognized with the Hebert Newby McCoy Award. After a brief postdoctoral appointment with Professor Christopher C. Cummins at the Massachusetts Institute of Technology he joined the faculty at Cornell University in 2001 as an assistant professor. In 2006, he was promoted to associate professor, and in 2009, he was named the Peter J. W. Debye Professor of Chemistry. In 2011, he moved to Princeton University.

In the course of his career, he has authored numerous scientific publications, and has been invited to give lectures and presentations in over 200 national and international seminars and conferences including the 2012 Falling Walls Conference in Berlin, where he gave a talk entitled "Breaking the Wall of Sustainable Chemistry: How Modern Alchemy Can Lead to Inexpensive and Clean Technology".

Research interests 
Chirik has popularized the field of catalysis with Earth-abundant Transition elements where iron and cobalt are used in place of precious metals such palladium, platinum and rhodium. Catalysts have been developed for applications in the pharmaceutical, flavor, fragrance, petrochemical, and fine chemical industries. One notable application is the preparation of commercial silicones with iron instead of platinum in the hydrosilylation of alkenes. Other notable applications have been in the areas of metal-ligand cooperativity, asymmetric hydrogenation, hydrosilylation, and hydroboration, and cycloaddition reactions.

Chirik has also developed Earth-abundant catalysts that operate in a more traditional sense, where the electron changes occur exclusively at the metal ("strong-field limit") with the judicious choice of the supporting ligand. This led to the development of catalysts for asymmetric hydrogenation, hydrogen-isotope exchange, C–H borylation and cross coupling, reactions that are of tremendous importance to the pharmaceutical industry.

Nitrogen functionalization and interconversion of ammonia with its elements 
Chirik also has a research program in the interconversion of ammonia (NH3) with its constituent elements, N2 and H2. The forward reaction, where N2 is converted to ammonia and other value-added nitrogen-containing products is driven by the high carbon footprint associated with industrial ammonia synthesis by the Haber-Bosch process, whereas the reverse reaction, where ammonia is converted back into its elements, N2 and H2, is driven by the goal of developing carbon-neutral fuels.

Using early transition metals with organic ligands to form a rationally designed coordination environment, Chirik has developed new routes to convert molecular nitrogen into value-added nitrogen-containing products.

By utilizing proton-coupled electron transfer (PCET), Chirik has been able to cleave ammonia to form H2 using the concept of "coordination-induced weakening".

Awards 

 Gabor Samorjai Award for Creative Research in Catalysis (2021)
 Linus Pauling Award (2020)
 Eni Environmental Solutions Prize (2019)
 ICI Lectureship, University of Calgary (2018)
 ACS Catalysis Lectureship for Advancement of Catalysis Science (2017) 
 Winner, Presidential Green Chemistry Challenge Award (2016)
 Closs Lecturer, University of Chicago (2014) 
 Dalton Lecturer, University of California, Berkeley (2011) 
 Winner, Blavatnik Award for Young Scientists, NYAS (2009) 
 Arthur C. Cope Scholar Award, American Chemical Society (2009) 
 Bessel Fellow of the Alexander von Humboldt Foundation (2008)
 Camille Dreyfus-Teacher Scholar (2006) 
 David and Lucile Packard Fellow in Science and Engineering (2004) 
 NSF CAREER Award (2003) 
 Herbert Newby McCoy Award for Outstanding Dissertation, Caltech (2000)

References

External links
 

Living people
Virginia Tech alumni
California Institute of Technology alumni
Organic chemists
21st-century American chemists
1973 births
Scientists from Philadelphia
Princeton University faculty